Carl Drews (27 January 1894 – 3 September 1983 ) was a German cinematographer.

Selected filmography
 The Last Kolczaks (1920)
 Roswolsky's Mistress (1921)
 The Secret of the Mummy (1921)
 The Eternal Struggle (1921)
 Lucrezia Borgia (1922)
 The Game with Women (1922)
 Tatjana (1923)
 The Third Watch (1924)
 Chronicles of the Gray House (1925)
 The Farmer from Texas (1925)
 The Schimeck Family (1926)
 The Divorcée (1926)
 Vienna, How it Cries and Laughs (1926)
 Derby (1926)
 The Ones Down There (1926)
 Sword and Shield (1926)
 The House of Lies (1926)
 Prinz Louis Ferdinand (1927)
 The Indiscreet Woman (1927)
 The Girl from Abroad (1927)
 The Queen of Spades (1927)
 The Trousers (1927)
 Ariadne in Hoppegarten (1928)
 Yacht of the Seven Sins (1928)
 The Lady with the Mask (1928)
 The Merry Widower (1929)
 Her Dark Secret (1929)
 The Hero of Every Girl's Dream (1929)
 Oh Those Glorious Old Student Days (1930)
 The Love Express (1931)
 Alarm at Midnight (1931)
 Marriage with Limited Liability (1931)
 Johann Strauss (1931)
 Trenck (1932)
 Chauffeur Antoinette (1932)
 The Ladies Diplomat (1932)
 Viennese Waltz (1932)
 The Mad Bomberg (1932)
 Dream of the Rhine (1933)
 Girls of Today (1933)
 The Gentleman from Maxim's (1933)
 The Big Bluff (1933)
 Adventure on the Southern Express (1934)
 The Voice of Love (1934)
 Heinz in the Moon (1934)
 Such a Rascal (1934)
 Love and the First Railway (1934)
 The Last Waltz (1934)
 Charley's Aunt (1934)
 Marriage Strike (1935)
 Punks Arrives from America (1935)
 Pillars of Society (1935)
 The Last Waltz (1936)
 All Lies (1938)
 Bachelor's Paradise (1939)
 Police Report (1939)
 Wunschkonzert (1940)

Bibliography
 Hardt, Ursula. From Caligari to California: Erich Pommer's Life in the International Film Wars. Berghahn Books, 1996.

External links

1894 births
1983 deaths
German cinematographers
Film people from Berlin